"Freak of the Week" is a song by British rappers Krept and Konan, featuring vocals from American singer Jeremih. The song was released for digital download in the United Kingdom on 28 June 2015 as the first single from their debut album The Long Way Home (2015). The single peaked at number nine on the UK Singles Chart.
It is a hip hop song that contains a sample of "Who Am I (Sim Simma)" by Beenie Man.

Music video
The music video was uploaded to Vevo on 5 May 2015. The video depicts the men rapping in a dim lit room while female dancers are behind them.

Track listing
 Digital single

 The Remixes EP

Charts

Weekly charts

Year-end charts

Certifications

Release history

References

2015 singles
2015 songs
Krept and Konan songs
Jeremih songs
Reggae fusion songs
Virgin Records singles
Songs written by Mustard (record producer)
Song recordings produced by Mustard (record producer)
Songs written by Jeremih